"Heroin" is the thirteenth single by the Japanese rock band Buck Tick, released on November 12, 1997.

Track listing

References

Personnel
Atsushi Sakurai – vocals
Hisashi Imai – guitar
Hidehiko Hoshino – guitar
Yutaka Higuchi – bass
Toll Yagami – drums

1997 singles
1997 songs
Buck-Tick songs
Mercury Records singles
Songs with lyrics by Atsushi Sakurai
Songs with music by Hisashi Imai